Christopher Barry Cooke (born 30 May 1986) is a South African cricketer who plays as a right-handed batsman and wicket-keeper. Born in Johannesburg, he has played for Western Province and Glamorgan. He replaced Michael Hogan as captain for the 2019 season.

In September 2021, in the final round of the 2021 County Championship, Cooke scored his maiden double century in first-class cricket, with an unbeaten 205 runs.

References

External links
 
 

1986 births
South African cricketers
Glamorgan cricketers
Western Province cricketers
Living people
English cricketers
South African emigrants to the United Kingdom
Birmingham Phoenix cricketers
Wicket-keepers